Leopolis is an unincorporated census-designated place in Shawano County, Wisconsin, United States. The community is located on County Highway D, between the towns of Herman, and Pella, Wisconsin. As of the 2010 census, its population is 87.

Notes

Census-designated places in Wisconsin
Census-designated places in Shawano County, Wisconsin